Caltagirone is an Italian surname that may refer to
Daniel Caltagirone (born 1972), English actor 
Francesco Bellavista Caltagirone (born 1939), Italian businessman, entrepreneur and philanthropist
Francesco Gaetano Caltagirone (born 1943), Italian businessman, cousin of Francesco Bellavista
Caltagirone Editore, an Italian publishing house founded by Francesco Gaetano 
Thomas Caltagirone (born 1942), American politician

Italian-language surnames
Toponymic surnames